The Cross Internacional de Venta de Baños is a cross country running competition that takes place in Venta de Baños, Castile and León, Spain. The competition was first held in 1980 and since then it has been held every year in mid-December. Among the past winners are international athletes, such as former World Cross Country Champions Kenenisa Bekele and Gelete Burka, and local athletes Marta Domínguez and Isaac Viciosa (both former European Champions).

The competition began life as a regional competition, the Cross de Navidad (Christmas cross country), in 1980. The race became national in its second edition and, following the acceptance of an English team into the competition in 1982, it obtained its current name – the Cross Internacional de Venta de Baños. The competition was televised throughout Spain for the first time in 1984, but it was not until 1995 that the competition was broadcast annually.

The course on which the competition is held is defined by the muddy and cold conditions typical of Palencia in winter. The event comprises two distinct parts: the professional senior races and the amateur fun run races. The competition's races are separated into categories based on age and sex, including: the professional senior races, veteran competitions, under-23 and junior competitions, as well as four other youth categories for children. The professional men's senior race is usually held over 10.7 kilometres while the course for the women's senior race tends to be 6.6 km long. Both senior races trace a path through the flat, grassy areas to the east of the village before running a loop around the local sports centre.

Past senior race winners

Wins by country

References
General
Podium Cross Internacional (List of medallists). Venta de Baños. Retrieved on 2009-12-27.
Specific

External links
Official website
Competition page from Real Federación Española de Atletismo

Cross country running competitions
Sports competitions in Castile and León
Athletics competitions in Spain
Recurring sporting events established in 1980
Cross country running in Spain
Annual sporting events in Spain
1980 establishments in Spain